William Korey (16 June 1922 – 26 August 2009) was an American lobbyist on international issues for B’nai B’rith. He was also a director of the Anti-Defamation League.

Korey wrote the influential book The Soviet Cage, one of a half-dozen books he published in the course of his career.

Personal details 
Korey graduated from the University of Chicago. He served in the American Army during World War II. He attended the Russian institute at Columbia University, inspired by interactions with Russian soldiers. After attaining his doctorate, Corey taught for a number of years, including at the City College of New York.

References

External links
Guide to the Papers of William Korey at the American Jewish Historical Society, New York.

1922 births
2009 deaths
University of Chicago alumni
United States Army personnel of World War II
Columbia University alumni
City College of New York faculty